Marsha Rose Thomson (born 21 December 1955) is an Australian politician. She was a member of the Victorian Legislative Assembly, representing the electoral district of Footscray for the Labor Party from 2006 to 2018; she previously served in the Victorian Legislative Council from 1999 to 2006. She was the first female Jewish minister in Australia.

Biography 
Thomson was an economic research officer, ministerial adviser, Implementation Manager with V/Line and Executive Officer of Youth Policy Development Council before being elected to the Legislative Council for Melbourne North Province in September 1999. 

She was Minister for Consumer Affairs 1999–2002 and Minister for Small Business 1999–2005. She was Minister for Information and Communication Technology from February 2002 and Minister for Consumer Affairs from January 2005, until 2006.

Due to the Upper House reforms, her former electorate of Melbourne North Province was abolished. As a result of Bruce Mildenhall's retirement from politics, Thomson ran for and won his electorate of Footscray at the 2006 State Election. She was Parliamentary Secretary to the Premier and Parliamentary Secretary for the Arts until the 2010 state election.

Personal life 
Thomson was married to federal Labor MP Kelvin Thomson and they have two children. They separated in 2003.

References

External links
 Parliamentary voting record of Marsha Thomson at Victorian Parliament Tracker

1955 births
Living people
Australian Labor Party members of the Parliament of Victoria
Members of the Victorian Legislative Council
Members of the Victorian Legislative Assembly
Jewish Australian politicians
Politicians from Melbourne
21st-century Australian politicians
21st-century Australian women politicians
Women members of the Victorian Legislative Council
Women members of the Victorian Legislative Assembly
People from Pascoe Vale, Victoria